Chalcoscirtus is a genus of jumping spiders that was first described by Philipp Bertkau in 1880.

timeline 
 it contains forty-five species and one subspecies, found in Asia, Europe, North America, and Egypt:
Chalcoscirtus alpicola (L. Koch, 1876) – North America, Central and Eastern Europe, Russia (European to Far East)
Chalcoscirtus ansobicus Andreeva, 1976 – Tajikistan
Chalcoscirtus atratus (Thorell, 1875) – Europe
Chalcoscirtus bortolgois Logunov & Marusik, 1999 – Mongolia
Chalcoscirtus brevicymbialis Wunderlust 1980 – Germany, Austria to Kazakhstan
Chalcoscirtus carbonarius Emerton, 1917 – USA, Canada, Russia
Chalcoscirtus catherinae Prószyński, 2000 – Egypt, Israel, Turkey
Chalcoscirtus charynensis Logunov & Marusik, 1999 – Kazakhstan
Chalcoscirtus diminutus (Banks, 1896) – USA
Chalcoscirtus flavipes Caporiacco, 1935 – Tajikistan, Karakorum
Chalcoscirtus fulvus Saito, 1939 – Japan
Chalcoscirtus glacialis Caporiacco, 1935 – USA (Alaska), Russia (Siberia), Kazakhstan, Mongolia
Chalcoscirtus g. sibiricus Marusik, 1991 – Russia
Chalcoscirtus grishkanae Marusik, 1988 – Russia (Siberia)
Chalcoscirtus hosseinieorum Logunov, Marusik & Mozaffarian, 2002 – Iran
Chalcoscirtus hyperboreus Marusik, 1991 – Russia
Chalcoscirtus infimus (Simon, 1868) (type) – Southern, Central Europe to Central Asia
Chalcoscirtus iranicus Logunov & Marusik, 1999 – Iran
Chalcoscirtus janetscheki (Denis, 1957) – Spain
Chalcoscirtus jerusalemicus Prószyński, 2000 – Israel
Chalcoscirtus kamchik Marusik, 1991 – Uzbekistan
Chalcoscirtus karakurt Marusik, 1991 – Central Asia, Iran
Chalcoscirtus kirghisicus Marusik, 1991 – Kyrgyzstan
Chalcoscirtus koponeni Logunov & Marusik, 1999 – Russia
Chalcoscirtus lepidus Wesolowska, 1996 – Central Asia, Iran
Chalcoscirtus lii Lei & Peng, 2010 – China
Chalcoscirtus martensi Zabka, 1980 – Central Asia, Nepal, India, China
Chalcoscirtus michailovi Logunov & Marusik, 1999 – Kazakhstan
Chalcoscirtus minutus Marusik, 1990 – Tajikistan
Chalcoscirtus molo Marusik, 1991 – Kyrgyzstan
Chalcoscirtus nenilini Marusik, 1990 – Kyrgyzstan
Chalcoscirtus nigritus (Thorell, 1875) – Europe, Turkey, Caucasus, Russia to Central Asia, China
Chalcoscirtus paraansobicus Marusik, 1990 – Russia, Central Asia
Chalcoscirtus parvulus Marusik, 1991 – Greece to Central Asia
Chalcoscirtus picinus Wesolowska & van Harten, 2011 – United Arab Emirates
Chalcoscirtus platnicki Marusik, 1995 – Kazakhstan
Chalcoscirtus pseudoinfimus Ovtsharenko, 1978 – Georgia
Chalcoscirtus rehobothicus (Strand, 1915) – Israel
Chalcoscirtus sinevi Marusik, Fomichev & Vahtera, 2018 – Russia (South Siberia)
Chalcoscirtus sublestus (Blackwall, 1867) – Madeira
Chalcoscirtus talturaensis Logunov & Marusik, 2000 – Russia
Chalcoscirtus tanasevichi Marusik, 1991 – Turkey, Caucasus, Russia (Europe to West Siberia), Kazakhstan, Central Asia
Chalcoscirtus tanyae Logunov & Marusik, 1999 – Russia
Chalcoscirtus vietnamensis Zabka, 1985 – Vietnam
Chalcoscirtus yinae Lei & Peng, 2010 – China
Chalcoscirtus zyuzini Marusik, 1991 – Central Asia

References

Salticidae
Salticidae genera
Spiders of Asia
Spiders of North America
Taxa named by Philipp Bertkau